Eznav (also Romanized as Eznāv and Aznāv; also known as Aznā’ū and Aznūb) is a village in Pish Khowr Rural District, Pish Khowr District, Famenin County, Hamadan Province, Iran. At the 2006 census, its population was 24, in 4 families.

References 

Populated places in Famenin County